Thunder is a 1929 American silent melodrama film starring Lon Chaney and directed by William Nigh. The 
film has no audible dialogue but featured a synchronized musical score and sound effects. Thunder was Chaney's penultimate film appearance and his last silent film.

The majority of Thunder is now considered lost, with only a half a reel of the entire footage known to survive.

Plot
Lon Chaney plays Grumpy Anderson, a railroad engineer with an obsession for running his train on time. His slavishness to promptness causes several tragedies which alienate him from his family. By the story's end, the engineer restores their faith in him and validates his obsession by forcing his train through a flood to bring badly needed Red Cross supplies to the victims.

Cast

Production notes

The film was shot on location in Manitowoc, Wisconsin, Green Bay, Wisconsin, Pulaski, Wisconsin, Green Valley, Wisconsin, and Chicago, Illinois. It was there that Chaney caught a cold during the snow scenes which then developed into walking pneumonia. Production was shut down for a time but was eventually completed. Chaney's illness combined with his throat cancer led to his death two months after the release of his last film, and only talkie, 1930's The Unholy Three.

Reception
Thunder was released to theaters on July 8, 1929, and eventually grossed a total of $1,018,000. It was Lon Chaney's fifth highest-grossing film for Metro-Goldwyn-Mayer.

See also
List of incomplete or partially lost films

References

External links 

 
Foreign language poster of the film

1929 films
1929 drama films
Silent American drama films
American silent feature films
American black-and-white films
Films directed by William Nigh
Films shot in Chicago
Films shot in Wisconsin
Metro-Goldwyn-Mayer films
Transitional sound films
Rail transport films
Lost American films
Melodrama films
1929 lost films
Lost drama films
1920s American films